Latu Malohi Vaeno (born 5 January 1995) is a Tongan-born, New Zealand rugby union player who currently plays as an outside back for  in the ITM Cup.   A strong debut season for them in 2015 saw him named in the  wider training group ahead of the 2016 Super Rugby season.

Vaeno moved to Rotorua Boys' High School as a teenager on a rugby scholarship, arriving in 2012 having impressed in playing for the Tonga under-19s in his first year of rugby, after previously playing volleyball.

References

1995 births
Living people
New Zealand rugby union players
Tongan rugby union players
Rugby union wings
Taranaki rugby union players
People educated at Rotorua Boys' High School
Tongan emigrants to New Zealand
Chiefs (rugby union) players
People from Nukuʻalofa
Tonga international rugby union players